Fearghal is an Irish, male given name. One possible derivation for the name is from the Gaelic words for "man" and ghal "valour", thus the name translates to "man of valour". The anglicized form is Fergal or Feargal.

Historic figures
Fearghal Ó Taidg an Teaghlaigh (died 1226), bodyguard to Cathal Crobhdearg Ua Conchobair
Fearghal Ó Gadhra (1597-1660), lord of Coolavin
Fearghal Mág Samhradháin (died 1393), chief of the McGovern clan
Fearghal mac Catharnach (died 821/823), ruler of Loch Riah

Politics
Fearghal McKinney (born 1962), former deputy leader of the SDLP

Arts
Fearghal Óg Mac an Bhaird (1550-1616), Gaelic-Irish poet
Fearghal mac Domhnuill Ruaidh Mac an Bhaird (died 1550), Gaelic-Irish bardic poet
Fearghal McGarry (born 1971), Irish historian

Sport
Fearghal Purcell (born 1980), Irish Footballer
Fearghal Flannery (born 1991), Irish Hurler

References

Irish masculine given names
Irish-language masculine given names